Rivendell Forest Prods. v. Georgia-Pacific Corp., 28 F.3d 1042 (10th Cir. 1994) was a case in which the United States Court of Appeals for the Tenth Circuit reversed the decision of the U.S. District Court for the District of Colorado, which had decided that Rivendell had failed to establish the existence of a trade secret in its customized computer software system, "Quote Screen", which was used to quote lumber prices to customers.

The Tenth Circuit instead decided that Rivendell had demonstrated that its software was potentially protectable as a trade secret because "a trade secret can include a system where the elements are in the public domain, but there has been accomplished an effective, successful and valuable integration of the public domain elements and the trade secret gave the claimant a competitive advantage".

Background
Rivendell was a reload wholesaler actively involved in the lumber industry. Before Rivendell went out of business, it frequently purchased lumber from Canadian mills and transported it to lumberyards it leased. Much like Rivendell, Georgia-Pacific was also a wholesaler and a supplier of lumber.

Timothy L. Cornwell was an employee of Rivendell Forest Products that supervised their "Quote Screen" customer price quoting system (something unique to their industry). The "Quote Screen" instantaneously quoted customers on lumber and freight prices, thereby giving Rivendell a strong market advantage. Rivendell claimed that the system was responsible for two to three times more sales as a result of its efficiency. Rivendell argued that its software constituted a trade secret.

Cornwell left Rivendell in 1990 and was hired by the defendant, Georgia-Pacific. He signed a Non-Disclosure Agreement (NDA) to become a part of Georgia-Pacific Corp., where he was to oversee their marketing department. Speculations of misappropriation of trade secrets arose when a computer system of customer relations—very similar to that of Rivendell—was developed at Georgia-Pacific. The "Quick Quote" screen at Georgia-Pacific highly resembled Rivendell's "Quote Screen".

U.S. District Court Case (1993)

Trade secret misappropriation 

The plaintiff, Rivendell Forest Products, alleged that the defendant, Georgia-Pacific Corporation, misappropriated its trade secrets. The district court was not persuaded by Rivendell's arguments, writing, "Much of the confusion in Rivendell's arguments stems from the fact that when it argues for the existence of a trade secret, it points generally to its software, secure in the knowledge that some part of that software, whether or not appropriated by Georgia-Pacific, contains a trade secret. By contrast, when Rivendell argues that Georgia-Pacific has used its trade secrets, unable to claim the software has been copied or otherwise compromised, Rivendell focuses broadly on the concepts and ideas contained in the software".

Rivendell claimed that its trade secret was its Quote Screen's unique method of concept integration. As a result, databases and functions were developed giving Rivendell its industry superiority. These ideas and concepts included automated board footage conversions, calculation of the dollar value per item per thickness/width, customer delivery prices, calculation of weight per bundle, inventory availability, and discount analysis.

It was then determined by Georgia-Pacific, which Rivendell did not dispute, that the two Quote Screen systems only had two common attributes: bundle sizes and board-footage conversions. These two attributes were determined to be standard constraints of the lumber industry and thus public knowledge.

The district court acknowledged that a unique combination of public domain elements could constitute a trade secret but insisted that Rivendell had failed to adequately specify what that unique combination was or how it provided them with a competitive advantage. The court wrote, "It would make little sense to allow individuals to throw veils of secrecy around the most common things, all in an attempt to establish their claim to a trade secret and then to prohibit others from appropriating their 'secret.' But "simply to assert a trade secret resides in some combination of otherwise known data is not sufficient, as the combination itself must be delineated with some particularity in establishing its trade secret status".

Appellate Decision (1994)

District Court Decision Reversed
On June 30, 1994, the Appellate Court reversed the 1993 decision on the grounds that Rivendell's trade secret could consist of a combination of elements in the public domain. They state that the "unified process, design and operation of which, in unique combination", can in fact afford, "a competitive advantage and is a protectable secret". The secret combination of public domain elements had in fact given Rivendell a valuable competitive advantage. For these reasons, the Court of Appeals held that Rivendell had demonstrated that its software was protectable as a trade secret, but the court remanded to the district court the question of whether sufficient secrecy was maintained by Rivendell.

A rehearing was requested and denied on August 1, 1994.

Effect
These cases represent the complex issues that may arise in asserting a trade secret in software that merely uniquely combines public domain elements. The Tenth Circuit's opinion is cited for the proposition that a trade secret may include a combination of elements which are generally known to the public.

References

See also
Uniform Trade Secrets Act
Mark A. Lemley, Peter S. Menell, Robert P. Merges, and Pamela Samuelson. Software And Internet Law. (New York: Aspen, 3d ed. 2006).

United States Court of Appeals for the Tenth Circuit cases
1994 in United States case law
Trade secret case law
Georgia-Pacific
United States intellectual property case law